Mohamed Naguib Hamed (born September 13, 1962) is an Egyptian athlete, one of only a few Egyptians to win gold medals in African athletic events. He competed in the men's discus throw at the 1984 Summer Olympics and the 1988 Summer Olympics.

Along with his colleagues Nagui Asaad, Hassan Ahmed Hamad, and Hisham Greiss, he formed a strong Egyptian team in throwing events—in fact, a team considered to be the strongest one Egypt has ever had, according to many Egyptian sports experts.

Twice African champion in Discus Throw: 1982, 1984.
Silver medallist of the African championship in Discus Throw, 1979.
Silver medallist in Discus Throw of the 1983 Mediterranean Games.
Twice Silver medallist in  Discus Throw of the All Africa Games: in Nairobi, 1987; Cairo, 1991.
Four times Gold medallist in Discus Throw of East and Central African Championships: 1981, 1983, 1984, 1985.

With 64.44 metres, he is a former Egyptian recordholder.

Achievements

See also
List of champions of Africa of athletics
Egyptian athletes
Athletics at the 1987 All-Africa Games
Athletics at the 1991 All-Africa Games
List of Egyptians

References

External links

1962 births
Egyptian male discus throwers
Living people
African Games silver medalists for Egypt
African Games medalists in athletics (track and field)
Athletes (track and field) at the 1984 Summer Olympics
Athletes (track and field) at the 1988 Summer Olympics
Olympic athletes of Egypt
Mediterranean Games silver medalists for Egypt
Mediterranean Games medalists in athletics
Athletes (track and field) at the 1987 All-Africa Games
Athletes (track and field) at the 1991 All-Africa Games
Athletes (track and field) at the 1983 Mediterranean Games
Athletes (track and field) at the 1987 Mediterranean Games